Eron Kiiza (born August 12, 1983) is a Ugandan poet, lawyer and environmentalist. He is the co-funder of Kiiza & Mugisha Advocates and CEO of The Environment Shield Limited. He is an Advocate of the High Court of Uganda, a member of the Uganda Law Society and the East African Law Society. Eron was nominated for the 2022 EU Human Rights Defender of the year. He was awarded by the National Coalition of Human rights Defenders Uganda in 2020 as the Central Uganda Human Rights Defender of the year. He was also recognized by LASPNET as an outstanding Public Interest Lawyer in 2022.

Early life and education 
Eron was born at Kabale Hospital in Kabale district in western Uganda to Asiimwe Maud (mother)and Mbabazi Alban (father) and was brought up in Ntungamo district. He started education from Rukura Primary School and later joined Kitunga day and boarding primary school for his primary education. After his primary education, Eron joined Muntuyera High School for his entire secondary education for six years. He holds a Bachelor of Laws Degree (LLB) from Uganda Christian University (UCU) and a Post Graduate Diploma in Legal Practice that he attained from Law Development Centre, Kampala . Eron has also attended courses at  Uganda Martyrs University, the University of Pretoria, the Media Legal Defense Initiative, 2015 USA's International Visitor Leadership Program (IVLP), the 2018 Internet Governance Forum (IGF) and the 2019 Stockholm Internet Forum.

Career 
During his secondary, Eron thought he would actually become a journalist after being a leader and a new leader for Muntuyera High school. He is currently a member of the Uganda Law Society Rule of law Committee and Human Rights Cluster and the Advisory Committee of Network for Public Interest Lawyers (NETPIL).

Cases 
In 2021, Eron was part of the legal team that advocated for the release of Nicholas Opiyo a human rights lawyer that was arrested after allegations of money laundering. Eron also spearheaded the campaign against the degradation of Bugoma forest in Hoima District in the North Western part of Uganda. He represented a group of more than 3000 people who were protesting against their eviction from five villages including Kambuye, Kyabaana, Kikoono, Lwensanga and Kanseera in Mubende District by George Kaweesi from a piece of land measuring  322.5 hectares. Eron was the lawyer and advocate to Author Kakwenza Rukirabashaija during his trials.

Eron also led climate and environment activists to save and advocate for the conservation of Bugema Forest against Justice Ssekaana and they won.

Personal life 
Eron is married to Sylvia Tumwebaze and the couple has two daughters. He enjoys pumpkin, sweet potatoes, indigenous mushrooms, and indigenous chicken as the foods he likes most.

Awards 

 2022 LASPNET outstanding Public Interest Lawyer.
 Central Uganda Human Rights Defender of the year.
 Notable nomination. Nominated for 2022 EU HRD of the year.

See also 

 Kakwenza Rukirabashaija

External links 

 Kiiza & Mugisha Advocates
 Journalists are Conveyor Belts of Information

References 

1983 births
Living people
Law Development Centre alumni
People from Western Region, Uganda
Uganda Christian University alumni
University of Pretoria alumni
21st-century Ugandan poets
21st-century Ugandan lawyers